"May Day" is a short story by F. Scott Fitzgerald published in The Smart Set in the July 1920 issue. The story was included in his 1922 short story collection Tales of the Jazz Age. The plot follows a blithe coterie of privileged Yale alumni who meet for a social dance during the May Day riots of 1919. The riots erupted in multiple cities including Cleveland, Ohio and New York City after socialists protested the conviction of Eugene Debs. The story has been compared to J.D. Salinger's "A Perfect Day for Bananafish."

Plot summary 

The story opens with an influx of recently decommissioned World War I soldiers descending on New York. Gordon Sterrett is an army veteran on his way to the Biltmore Hotel to meet his friend from college, Philip Dean. Sterrett informs him that he needs to borrow money because he is unemployed and he is the victim of a blackmailing plot by a woman named Jewel Hudson. Sterrett needs $300 to pay off Jewel. He envisions pursuing a career as an artist. Dean, however, is not convinced, characterizing Sterrett as "bankrupt—morally as well as financially."

Dean invites Sterrett to breakfast where they discuss a Yale alumni dance hosted by the Gamma Psi fraternity. Dean pays for the breakfast and offers Sterrett $80. They agree to meet at the fraternity dance.

Two other demobilized soldiers, Carroll Key and Gus Rose, are introduced. Key and Rose are described as "ugly and ill-nourished." A Jewish man preaches on the street about the deleterious effects of the war before he is assaulted by a group of soldiers. The group increases in size, marching down Sixth Avenue toward Tenth Street. Key and Rose join the group but abandon it in search of booze. They travel to Delmonico's restaurant where Key's brother, George, works as a waiter. George takes them to a storeroom that is connected to the ballroom where the fraternity dance is taking place.

Edith Bradin, Sterrett's ex-girlfriend, is at the dance. She seeks to dump her date, Peter Himmel, and meet up with Sterrett. When she sees him, however, she is dismayed by his appearance. Himmel, realizing that Edith has lost interest in him, mingles with Key and Rose, who have joined the party and are intoxicated. Edith leaves the party to meet with her brother, Henry, a reporter at the Radical "New York Trumpet", at the newspaper office. Edith feels that her brother disapproves of her way of life, since as a Socialist he wants a world where such parties will be impossible. However, he tells her to enjoy life as long as she is young.

Jewel Hudson arrives at the dance looking for Sterrett. Sterrett informs her that he could not obtain the $300. They leave the party together.

At the newspaper office, Henry and his co-worker Bartholomew explain to Edith the violent nature of the conflict taking place on the streets. The soldiers, tough they are against war protesters and socialists, they "don't know what they want, or what they hate, or what they like." The group of soldiers, of which Key is a part, attacks the office. The reporters are called traitors. Key is thrown out of a window to his death. Henry's leg is broken.

Intoxicated members from the party go to Child's restaurant after the dance. This group, like Dean and Himmel, is made up of the wealthy. Rose is not. He learns that his friend Key has died. Jewel and Sterrett show up at the restaurant as chaos erupts. Unlike the group of soldiers, this gathering is made up of the well off. Himmel and Dean are thrown out of the restaurant for threatening a waiter and starting a food fight.

After "breakfast and liquor," Himmel and Dean return to the Biltmore after seeing Edith who does not want to speak with them. Sterrett awakens intoxicated in a seedy hotel on Sixth Avenue. He learns that he and Jewel had gotten married the night before. He then leaves the hotel to purchase a gun and returns to his rented room on East Street, where, leaning across a table containing his art supplies, he shoots himself in the head.

Background and composition 
May Day was sold directly to The Smart Set before Fitzgerald had a literary agent (later Harold Ober). It is noted that Fitzgerald based some of the events on those he experienced in New York City. The story is noteworthy for its length, the familiar themes of lost youth and wealth as well as two distinct yet interrelated plots. All were themes which Fitzgerald would revisit throughout his literary career. Fitzgerald described the story as illustrating the hysteria signaled the beginning of the Jazz Age:

During the story a Jewish man is beat up by a crowd as he expounds socialist rhetoric. Fitzgerald, however, was not an anti-semite, and his characterizing of the Jewish man can be seen as a commentary of the brutality of the crowd contrasted with the man's wit and fervor.

A major issue in the story are the class differences between the affluent Yale graduates and the working class soldiers, discharged from military service and facing an uncertain civilian life and the prospect of unemployment. The Socialists try to reach out to the soldiers and tell them their plight is due to Capitalism, but the soldiers react with violence towards the Socialists themselves.

References

Citations

Works cited

External links 

 The Smart Set — Volume 62, No. 3 — "May Day" (Modernist Journals Project)
 The Smart Set — Volume 62, No. 3 — "May Day" (University of South Carolina)

Short stories by F. Scott Fitzgerald
1920 short stories
1920s short stories
Works originally published in The Smart Set
American short stories
Fiction about suicide
Short stories about suicide